Geert Nentjes (born 4 September 1998) is a Dutch professional darts player who plays in Professional Darts Corporation events.

Career

In 2018, he qualified for the 2018 UK Open, but was knocked out in the second round by Darryl Pilgrim.

In November 2018, he qualified for the 2019 PDC World Darts Championship as one of the two the highest ranked players on the PDC Development Tour, along with Ted Evetts.

He reached the quarterfinal at the 2018 PDC World Youth Championship, in which he got beaten 6-0 by Martin Schindler.

As one of the two highest ranked players from PDC Development Tour, he received two years Tour card for season 2019 and 2020. He played both PDC Pro Tour and PDC Development Tour in 2019. Finishing 3rd overall in PDC Development Tour ranking, he secured his sport at the 2020 PDC World Darts Championship, because both the winner and the second, Ted Evetts and Luke Humphries, qualified for the championship via Pro Tour. Nentjes faced Kim Huybrechts in the first round, in a very close match he eventually lost 2–3.

Despite some signs of promise, Nentjes finished 88th on the PDC Order of Merit after his first two years as a professional. However, he won a two-year Tour Card straight back at European Q School at the start of 2021, beating Boris Koltsov 6–5 in the final on day two.

World Championship results

PDC
 2019: First round (lost to Nathan Aspinall 0–3)
 2020: First round (lost to Kim Huybrechts 2–3)
 2023: First round (lost to Leonard Gates 1–3)

Performance timeline

PDC European Tour

References

External links

1998 births
Living people
Dutch darts players
Professional Darts Corporation current tour card holders
People from Urk